The Regional Council of Pays de la Loire is the deliberative assembly of the French region of Pays de la Loire. The regional council is made up of 93 regional councilors elected for a period of six years by direct universal suffrage and chaired by Christelle Morançais (LR) since 2017. It sits in Nantes, at the Hôtel de Région.

The seats in this region are divided by department:

 35 councillors for Loire-Atlantique
 19 councillors for Maine-et-Loire
 17 councillors for the Vendée
 15 councillors for Sarthe
 7 councillors for Mayenne

Current Regional Council 
The current council was elected in June 2021 for a term of office until 2028.

Composition 

Following the installation session of the July 2, 2021, the regional council is chaired by Christelle Morançais.

Vice-presidents

Former compositions

Presidents

From 1986 to 1992 
 49 of the RPR - UDF
 31 of the PS
 5 of the PCF
 3 of the DVG
 3 of the RN
 2 of the DVD

The president of the regional council was Olivier Guichard (RPR).

From 1992 to 1998 

 48 of the UPF
 18 of the MRG - PS
 8 of the RN
 7 of the Verts
 7 of the Ecology Generation
 4 of the Far-Left
 1 of the CPNT

The president of the regional council was Olivier Guichard (UPF).

From 1998 to 2004 

 50 of the Union of the Right
 32 of the Union of the Left
 7 of the Extreme Right
 3 of the CPNT
 1 of the Extreme Left

The president of the regional council was François Fillon (RPR) until 2002 (resigned following his appointment to the government), then Jean-Luc Harousseau (UMP).

From 2004 to 2010 

 Group of Socialists and Radical and Miscellaneous Left: 39 elected
 Group of the Union of Loire Valley: 26 elected
 Group of The Greens: 13 elected
 Group of Communists: 8 elected
 Group of Centrists: 7 elected

The president was Jacques Auxiette (PS).

From 2010 to 2015 

 Group of Socialists and Radical and Miscellaneous Left: 38 elected
 Group of Union of Pays de la Loire: 19 elected
 Group of The Greens: 17 elected
 Group of Communists: 5 elected
 Centrist Alliance Group: 4 elected
 Group Movement for France: 4 elected
 Ecology Solidarity Group: 3 elected
 New Center Group: 3 elected

The president was Jacques Auxiette.

From 2015 to 2021 

 Group of Republicans and Related: 37 elected
 Socialist, Ecologist, Radical and Republican Group: 17 elected
 Union of the Group of Centrists: 17 elected
 National Front Group - Navy Blue Rally: 8 elected (13 at the start of their term of office)
 Ecologist and Citizen Group: 6 elected
 Alliance Group for the Pays de la Loire: 5 elected
 LREM: 3 elected

The president of the Council was Bruno Retailleau.

References 

Pays de la Loire
Pays de la Loire
Politics of France